Oroperipatus weyrauchi is a species of velvet worm in the Peripatidae family. The original description of this species is based on only two specimens, a male (35 mm in length) with 40 pairs of legs and a larger female (45 mm in length) with 38 leg pairs. The type locality is in Peru.

References

Onychophorans of tropical America
Onychophoran species
Animals described in 1952